Byomkesh Bose (1927 – 4 October 2003) was an Indian association football player. He was part of the team that played at the football competition in the 1952 Summer Olympics, but he did not play in any matches. He died in 2003.

Playing career
Bose appeared with East Bengal from 1948 to 1958 and captained the team in 1951. He represented Syed Abdul Rahim managed India at the 1952 Summer Olympics.

Honours
East Bengal
IFA Shield: 1949, 1951, 1953
Durand Cup: 1953

References

External links
 

1927 births
Indian footballers
Footballers from Kolkata
East Bengal Club players
India international footballers
Olympic footballers of India
Footballers at the 1952 Summer Olympics
2003 deaths
Association football defenders
Calcutta Football League players